The Football Federation Tasmania 2015 season was the third season under the new competition format in Tasmania.  The competition consists of three major divisions across the State of Tasmania,  created from the teams in the previous structure. The overall champion for the new structure qualified for the National Premier Leagues finals series, competing with the other state federation champions in a final knockout tournament to decide the National Premier Leagues Champion for 2015.

Men's Competitions

2015 NPL Tasmania

The 2015 T-League season was played as a triple round-robin over 21 rounds.

League Cup
An end of season finals series for the Victory Cup was held using an expanded format, which included the top six teams from the Victory League as well as the premiers from the Northern Championship (Somerset) and Southern Championship (University of Tasmania). The quarter-final and semi-final matches were decided by random draw.

Top Scorers

2015 Tasmanian Championships

2015 Northern Championship

The 2015 Northern Championship is the third edition of the newly renamed Northern Championship as the second level domestic association football competition in Tasmania (third level overall in Australia). The league consists of 8 teams, playing 21 matches.

2015 Southern Championship

The 2015 Southern Championship is the third edition of the newly renamed Southern Championship as the second level domestic association football competition in Tasmania (third level overall in Australia). All teams will play 2 complete rounds until Round 16. At the end of Round 16 the top 4 teams will play an additional round against each other. The next 4 teams will also play each other an additional time. The team finishing last will not continue after Round 16.

2015 Tasmanian League One

2015 Northern League One

The 2015 Northern League One was the third edition of the new Tasmanian League One as the third level domestic association football competition in Tasmania (fourth level overall in Australia). 8 teams competed, all playing each other twice for a total of 21 matches.

2015 Southern League One

The 2015 Southern League One was the third edition of the new Tasmanian League One as the third level domestic association football competition in Tasmania (fourth level overall in Australia). All teams will play 2 complete rounds until Round 16. At the end of Round 16 the top 4 teams will play an additional round against each other. The next 4 teams will also play each other an additional time. The team finishing last will not continue after Round 16.

2015 Tasmanian League Two

2015 Northern League Two

The 2015 Northern League Two was the third edition of the new Tasmanian League Two as the fourth level domestic association football competition in Tasmania (fifth level overall in Australia). 6 teams competed, all playing each other four times for a total of 20 matches. No teams were promoted or relegated this season.

NBSeveral matches were postponed and subsequently could not be played.

2015 Southern League Two

The 2015 Southern League Two was the third edition of the new Tasmanian League Two as the fourth level domestic association football competition in Tasmania (fifth level overall in Australia). 5 teams competed, all playing each other five times for a total of 20 matches. Derwent United were selected to join the Southern Championship at the end of the season.

NBTwo matches were postponed and subsequently could not be played.

2015 Tasmanian League Three

2015 Southern League Three

The 2015 Southern League Three was the third edition of the new Tasmanian League Three as the fifth level domestic association football competition in Tasmania (sixth level overall in Australia). 9 teams competed, all playing each other twice during a total of 16 matches.

2015 Tasmanian League Four

2015 Southern League Four

The 2015 Southern League Four was the third edition of the new Tasmanian League Four as the sixth level domestic association football competition in Tasmania (seventh level overall in Australia). 10 teams competed, all playing each other twice for a total of 18 rounds.

2015 Tasmanian League Five

2015 Southern League Five

The 2015 Southern League Five was the first edition of the new Tasmanian League Five as the seventh level domestic association football competition in Tasmania (eighth level overall in Australia). 7 teams competed, all playing each other three times, for a total of 18 rounds.

Women's Competition

2015 Northern Championship

2015 Southern Championship

2015 Statewide Finals series

Cup Competitions

The Milan Lakoseljac Cup competition also served as the Tasmanian Preliminary rounds for the 2015 FFA Cup. South Hobart entered at the Round of 32, where they were eliminated.

References

Football Federation Tasmania
Football Federation Tasmania seasons